Kot Addu , is a tehsil located in Kot Addu District, Punjab, Pakistan. The city of Kot-Addu is the headquarters of the tehsil which is administratively subdivided into 32 Union Councils.

See also
Manhhan Sharif
Basti Jara miran wali
03456005154

References

Muzaffargarh District
Tehsils of Punjab, Pakistan